The First National Bank (also known as the Metropolitan Building and the Enloe Building) building in downtown Long Beach, California is listed on the National Register of Historic Places.

The original bank building had three stories, which were surpassed in 1906 with the current building, designed by Los Angeles architects Robert F. Train and Robert E. Williams. The distinctive clock tower with its six-foot-diameter clock face was added in 1907. The structure was designed in a French Renaissance Revival style utilizing pressed yellow brick on the street sides and common red brick on the remaining two sides.

A number of bank tenants have occupied the building, including (in order):
The First National Bank of Long Beach (5456) (1906-1925)
The California National Bank of Long Beach (11873) (1925-1929)
California First National Bank of Long Beach (11873) (1929-1936)
Bank of America, National Trust & Savings Association (13044) 1936 to sometime in the 1960s.

During the 1950s, many of the original decorative elements such as the decorative cornice were removed or covered as part of modernizations efforts. In the 1980s, federal tax incentives motivated a project to restore the building to its original look and to repair the clock tower. Today, the ground floor of the building has housed L'Opera Ristorante since 1990.

See also
 List of City of Long Beach Historic Landmarks

References 

 
 

 Jacob, A.  On-line Exhibit on the First National Bank | url =http://www.cvcc-inc.com/5456/home.htm

Commercial buildings on the National Register of Historic Places in California
Buildings and structures in Long Beach, California
Renaissance Revival architecture in California
Landmarks in Long Beach, California
Buildings and structures on the National Register of Historic Places in Los Angeles County, California